The spadebills are a genus, Platyrinchus, of Central and South American passerine birds in the tyrant flycatcher family Tyrannidae. They have broad, flat, triangular bills.

The genus was erected by the French zoologist Anselme Gaëtan Desmarest in 1805 with the white-crested spadebill (Platyrinchus platyrhynchos) as the type species. The name Platyrhynchos is from the Ancient Greek platus "broad" and rhunkhos  "bill".

Species
The genus contains seven species:

References

Platyrinchus
Bird genera